Salavea (also spelled Salave'a) is a Samoan surname. Notable people with the surname include:

 Joe Salave'a (born 1975), American football defensive lineman and coach
 Manaia Salavea (born 1986), Samoan rugby union footballer

Samoan culture
Samoan-language surnames